The 1955 Sylvania Television Awards were presented on December 2, 1955, in New York City. The Sylvania Awards were established by Sylvania Electric Products.

The committee presented the following awards:
 Best show of the year - Peter Pan (NBC)
 Best new TV series - The $64,000 Question (CBS)
 Best performance by an actor - Sidney Poitier in A Man Is Ten Feet Tall (NBC)
 Most original teleplay - A Man Is Ten Feet Tall by Robert Alan Aurthur (NBC)
 Best performance by an actress - Julie Harris in Wind From The South (CBS)
 Best performance in classical role - Jose Ferrer in Cyrano De Bergerac (NBC)
 Best performance, supporting actress - Mildred Dunnock, A Child Is Born (ABC)
 Best dramatic show - Patterns by Rod Serling
 Best comedy show - You'll Never Get Rich, Phil Silvers (CBS)
 Variety entertainment - The Ed Sullivan Show (CBS)
 Best musical series - The Voice of Firestone (ABC)
 Best dramatic series - Kraft Television Theatre (NBC)
 Best documentary - The Vice Presidency, Edward R. Murrow (CBS)
 Network public service - The Search (CBS)
 Local public service - Our Religious Roots (KPIX San Francisco) and Dateline Washington (WDSU New Orleans)
 Network news and special events - Presidential news conference, award to James Hagerty, White House News Secretary
 Local news and special events - WBX in Boston
 Network education series - Omnibus (CBS)
 Best local education series - Your future unlimited (WMCT)
 Best network children's show - The Mickey Mouse Club, Disney
 Best local children's show - The Children's Corner, Fred Rogers, producer (WQED Pittsburgh)
 Special award for "The Greatest Contributions to creative Television Techniques" - Sylvester Weaver, president of NBC
 Best sports coverage - Gillette Safety Razor Company

References

Sylvania Awards